Hajji Hoseyn Shirzehi (also Romanized as Ḩājjī Ḩoseyn Shīrzehī) is a village in Margan Rural District, in the Central District of Hirmand County, Sistan and Baluchestan Province, Iran. At the 2006 census, its population was 35, in 7 families.

References 

Populated places in Hirmand County